South Banda is a dialect continuum of the Banda languages spoken by around 200,000 or so people, primarily in the Central African Republic but with ten thousand or so in the Democratic Republic of the Congo (6,000 as of the 1984 census). The two varieties may be mutually intelligible.

References

Languages of the Democratic Republic of the Congo
Languages of the Central African Republic
Banda languages